Pinkeye or Pink Eye may refer to:

 Conjunctivitis, an inflammation of the outermost layer of the eye and the inner surface of the eyelids
 Infectious bovine keratoconjunctivitis, an infectious conjunctivitis in cattle caused by the bacterium Moraxella bovis
 "Pinkeye" (South Park), an episode of the television series
 Pink Eye (film), a 2008 American horror film
 Pinkeye, a minor character from the novel Animal Farm
 Pinkeye mullet (Trachystoma petardi), a species of fish
 Solanum tuberosum 'Pink Eye', a potato cultivar